Paramermis is a genus of nematodes belonging to the family Mermithidae.

Species:
 Paramermis anteriostoma Rubzov, 1977 
 Paramermis antica Rubzov, 1976

References

Mermithidae